Province Lake is a  water body located on the border between New Hampshire and Maine in the United States. Approximately  of the lake lie in the towns of Effingham and Wakefield, New Hampshire, with the remainder in Parsonsfield, Maine. Its outlet is the South River, flowing north to the Ossipee River, a tributary of the Saco River.

It is fed by several wetland areas, one named stream (Hobbs Brook), and by underwater springs. The quality of the water is high. The lake is classified as a warmwater fishery, with observed species including smallmouth and largemouth bass, chain pickerel, and horned pout. Loons, great blue heron, occasional mergansers and bald eagles are seen at the lake.

See also

List of lakes in Maine
List of lakes in New Hampshire

References

Lakes of York County, Maine
Lakes of Carroll County, New Hampshire
Lakes of Maine